Deltochilini (or Canthonini) is a tribe of scarab beetles, in the dung beetle subfamily (Scarabaeinae). Members of this group vary widely in size (2–33 mm long) and shape, but were thought to be derived from an ancient ball-rolling lineage. The outer edges of the front tibiae have less than four teeth. The grouping based on these characteristics has, however, been found to have little phylogenetic validity, and the placement of several genera in the tribe is likely to change.

Taxonomy
There has been some controversy regarding the valid name for this tribe. Deltochilini is the senior name, and has precedence under the ICZN, but in 2006, Smith suggested that the name Canthonini, though junior, might be preserved under Code Article 35.5, which can be used to preserve junior names if they are higher in taxonomic rank than the senior names of constituent taxa. However, this Article does not apply when two names are competing for the same taxonomic rank (as in this case, both being used at the rank of tribe), so this conclusion has been reversed by subsequent classifications, restoring Deltochilini as the valid name.

The tribe comprises about 800 species in 120 genera: They constitute a high proportion of the dung beetle diversity in many parts of the world; more than 35% of the genera in the Americas, Australia, Madagascar and many islands. However, in the Afro-Eurasian regions, they make up less than 20% of the genera.

Genera 

 Agamopus
 Aleiantus
 Aliuscanthoniola
 Amphistomus
 Anachalcos
 Anisocanthon
 Anomiopus
 Anonthobium
 Aphengoecus
 Apotolamprus
 Aptenocanthon
 Apterepilissus
 Arachnodes
 Aulacopris
 Baloghonthobium
 Bohepilissus
 Boletoscapter
 Byrrhidium
 Caeconthobium
 Cambefortantus
 Canthochilum
 Canthodimorpha
 Canthon
 Canthonella
 Canthonidia
 Canthonosoma
 Canthotrypes
 Cephalodesmius
 Circellium
 Coproecus
 Cryptocanthon
 Deltepilissus
 Deltochilum
 Diorygopyx
 Drogo
 Dwesasilvasedis
 Endroedyolus
 Epactoides
 Epilissus
 Epirinus
 Eudinopus
 Falsignambia
 Gyronotus
 Hammondantus
 Hansreia
 Holocanthon
 Ignambia
 Janssensantus
 Lambroma
 Lepanus
 Macropanelus
 Madaphacosoma
 Malagoniella
 Megathopa
 Megathoposoma
 Melanocanthon
 Mentophilus
 Monoplistes
 Namakwanus 
 Nanos
 Nebulasilvius
 Nesovinsonia
 Ochicanthon
 Odontoloma
 Oficanthon
 Onthobium
 Outenikwanus
 Panelus
 Paracanthon
 Parvuhowdenius
 Peckolus
 Penalus
 Phacosomoides
 Pseudignambia
 Pseudocanthon
 Pseudonthobium
 Pseudophacosoma
 Pycnopanelus
 Saphobiamorpha
 Saphobius
 Sauvagesinella
 Scybalocanthon
 Scybalophagus
 Sikorantus
 Silvaphilus
 Sinapisoma
 Sphaerocanthon
 Streblopus
 Sylvicanthon
 Tanzanolus
 Temnoplectron
 Tesserodon
 Tesserodoniella
 Tetraechma
 Vulcanocanthon
 Xenocanthon
 Zonocopris

Ecology
Most species are coprophagous, but some feed on carrion, others on fungi, and the smaller species may utilize leaf litter (saprophagous). They are largely diurnal.

References

 
Beetle tribes